Marga Minco (pseudonym of Sara Menco; born 31 March 1920) is a Dutch journalist and writer.

Biography 
Born in Ginneken to an Orthodox Jewish family, Minco began work as a trainee journalist on the Bredasche Courant in 1938. Her real surname was Menco, but an official accidentally switched the first vowel. Following the German invasion of the Netherlands in May 1940, and even before proclamation by the occupying forces of anti-Jewish measures, she was fired by order of the newspaper's German-sympathizing board. 

In the early part of World War II Minco lived in Breda, Amersfoort, and Amsterdam. She contracted a mild form of tuberculosis and ended up being treated in hospitals in Utrecht and Amersfoort. In the autumn of 1942 she returned to Amsterdam and her parents, who were forced by the German occupiers to move into the city's Jewish Quarter.

Later in the war, Minco's parents, her brother, and her sister were all deported, but having escaped arrest herself she spent the rest of the war in hiding and was the family's only survivor. She also received a new name, Marga Faes, the first part of which she continued to use. Minco married the poet and translator Bert Voeten (who died in 1992) whom she had met in 1938 and with whom she hid during the war. After the war, they worked on a number of newspapers and magazines. They have two daughters, one of whom is the writer Jessica Voeten. She turned 100 in March 2020.

Work 
In 1957 Minco published her first book,  ("The bitter herb"), in which a nameless character goes through war experiences reminiscent of the author's. The title of her later book Een leeg huis ("An empty house") refers not only to the demolished house that the protagonist finds after emerging from hiding at the end of the occupation but also to the emptiness that she and her friend Yona experience in the postwar years, to which was added the distance and sometimes even hostility displayed by many people in the Netherlands towards returnees from the concentration camps. This phenomenon was further described by Marga Minco in her collection of short stories, De andere kant ("The other side").

Existentialism imposes a special tightness on her work. The main characters, often survivors of the Holocaust, experience their lives as meaningless. Often, they have survived the war only by a series of coincidences, while their loved ones have been murdered. Frieda Borgstein, for example, in the novella De val ("The Fall"), manages by chance to survive the whole war without falling into the hands of the Nazis who have taken her husband's life. She dies, nevertheless, just before her 85th birthday, by falling accidentally into an unprotected well.

Bibliography 

 Het bittere kruid – een kleine kroniek (1957) (The bitter herb – a little chronicle)
 Het adres (1957) (The address)
 De andere kant (collection) (1959) (The other side)
 Tegenvoeters (with Bert Voeten) (1961) (Antipodeans)
 Kijk 'ns in de la (1963) (Have a look in the drawer)
 Het huis hiernaast (1965) (The house next door)
 Terugkeer (1965) (Return)
 Een leeg huis (1966) (An empty house)
 Het bittere kruid / Verhalen / Een leeg huis (1968) (The bitter herb / Stories / An empty house)
 De trapeze 6 (with Mies Bouhuys) (1968)
 De dag dat mijn zuster trouwde (1970) (The day my sister got married)
 Meneer Frits en andere verhalen uit de vijftiger jaren (1974) (Mr Frits and other stories from the fifties)
 Je mag van geluk spreken (in Bulkboek 46, 1975) (Talk about lucky)
 Het adres en andere verhalen (1976) (The address and other stories)
 Floroskoop – Maart (1979) (Floroscope – March)
 Verzamelde verhalen 1951–1981 (1982) (Collected stories)
 De val (1983) (The fall)
 De glazen brug (Boekenweekgeschenk 1986) (The glass bridge)
 De glazen brug (with Loe de Jong): De joodse onderduik) (1988) (The glass bridge / Jews in hiding)
 De zon is maar een zeepbel, twaalf droomverslagen (1990) (The sun is but a soap bubble, twelve dream reports)
 De verdwenen bladzij – verhalenbundel voor kinderen (1994) (The missing page – stories for children)
 Nagelaten dagen (1997) (Bequeathed days)
 De schrijver (a literary relay with Harry Mulisch, Gerrit Komrij, Adriaan van Dis, Maarten 't Hart, Remco Campert, Hugo Claus, and Joost Zwagerman) (2000) (The writer)
 Decemberblues (2003)
 Storing (stories) (2004)
 Een sprong in de tijd (essay written for the Remembrance Day ceremony in Nieuwe Kerk, Amsterdam, and delivered by her daughter Jessica Voeten) (2008) (A leap in time)

Awards 
 1957 – Bureau voor Postreclame en Adressen De Mutator N.V. Short-story Prize for Het adress
 1958 – Vijverberg Prize for Het bittere kruid
 1999 – Annie Romein Prize for her entire oeuvre
 2005 – Constantijn Huygens Prize for her entire oeuvre
 2019 - P.C. Hooft Award for her entire oeuvre

References

External links

1920 births
Living people
20th-century Dutch novelists
20th-century Dutch women writers
21st-century Dutch novelists
21st-century Dutch women writers
Constantijn Huygens Prize winners
Dutch centenarians
Dutch journalists
Dutch women novelists
People from Breda
Women centenarians